Lucien Kassi-Kouadio (born 21 December 1963) is an Ivorian footballer. He played in nine matches for the Ivory Coast national football team from 1983 to 1992. He was also named in Ivory Coast's squad for the 1990 African Cup of Nations tournament.

References

External links
 

1963 births
Living people
Ivorian footballers
Ivory Coast international footballers
1990 African Cup of Nations players
Place of birth missing (living people)
Association football midfielders
Stade d'Abidjan players
AS Cannes players
FC Montceau Bourgogne players
ASEC Mimosas players
Africa Sports d'Abidjan players
Ivorian expatriate footballers
Expatriate footballers in France